

The Istra Ezhik (en: Small hedgehog) is a Russian agricultural aircraft designed and developed by Istra (Istra Experimental Mechanics Depot).

Design and development
The Ezhik design begun in 1999 and first exhibited in August 2005 and flew some time after.  The Ezhik is a conventional low-wing cantilever monoplane powered by a Walter Minor M-337A engine. It first appeared with a conventional single fin but was later modified with twin rectangular fins. It has a raised and enclosed cockpit with two tandem-seats and a conventional landing gear with a tailwheel. The Ezhik has a welded steel tube fuselage with aluminium skin forward of the cockpit with the rest of the fuselage and tail fabric covered. It has a monospar wing and a chemical hopper in the fuselage feeds eight rotary atomisers fitted beneath the wings.

Specifications

References
Notes

Bibliography

Agricultural aircraft
2000s Russian civil utility aircraft
Low-wing aircraft
Single-engined tractor aircraft
Twin-tail aircraft
Conventional landing gear